This is the discography of British singer-songwriter David Essex.

Albums

Studio albums

Live albums

Soundtrack albums

Cast recording albums

Compilation albums

Video albums

EPs

Singles

Notes

References

Discographies of British artists
Pop music discographies
Rock music discographies